Dr. George W. Thompson House is a historic home located at Winamac, Pulaski County, Indiana. It was built in 1894–1895, and is a two-story, roughly square, Romanesque Revival style brick dwelling with Colonial Revival design details. It has a hipped roof. It features projecting bays, a conical-roofed octagonal corner turret, and a large round-arched window.  Also on the property are the contributing carriage house and pump house.

It was listed on the National Register of Historic Places in 1984.

References

Houses on the National Register of Historic Places in Indiana
Romanesque Revival architecture in Indiana
Colonial Revival architecture in Indiana
Houses completed in 1897
Buildings and structures in Pulaski County, Indiana
National Register of Historic Places in Pulaski County, Indiana